The Grande Traversata delle Alpi (GTA) is a long-distance hiking trail in the Italian region of Piedmont. There are a number of transverse valleys along the route. Day hikes typically connect high-lying valley communities with each other via historic pass routes.

Route 

The GTA may be walked in either direction; the following direction is from north to south.

The trail begins in the Pennine Alps; the original plan to let the GTA start on Lago Maggiore has not been implemented due to the lack of suitable accommodations. The official start is at Molini di Calasca in Valle Anzasca; however, Forno in Valstrona is also used, and some walkers start at Valais, Switzerland.

The trail follows the north side of Valsesia to Alagna, near Monte Rosa. There the route bends south, avoiding the Aosta valley (which is not part of the Piedmont). The trail passes Oropa and reaches Quincinetto, in the valley where the Dora Baltea breaks through from Val d'Aosta into the lowlands of the Po. At , it is the lowest point of the GTA.

The GTA then enters the Graian Alps, leading (in six sections) west. It passes Gran Paradiso near the French border, where it continues south. After crossing the three valleys of Lanzo Torinese, the Susa Valley is reached after 26 sections. This is the approximate midpoint of the GTA, and the boundary between its northern and southern parts.

In the Cottian Alps, between the Susa and Varaita valleys, were several variants of the GTA. An eastern route, snow-free by early June, is neglected; the main, western route is well-maintained. The GTA runs south from the Susa Valley, crossing the Chisone, Germanasca, and Pellice Valleys. The Monte Viso bypass uses two huts belonging to the Club Alpino Italiano. The trail then crosses the Varaita, Maira, Grana, Stura di Demonte, Gesso, and Vermenagna  Valleys. Near Monte Argentera, in the Maritime Alps, are several more Club Alpino Italiano huts. The GTA then enters the Ligurian Alps, ending at Viozene in Ormea. Trail extensions continue to the train stations at Ormea or Gerassio, cross to the Alta Via dei Monti Liguri or lead to the Mediterranean Sea (which can be reached in about three days from Ormea).

The GTA is usually snow-free at the end of June. A mountain trail, it has no technical difficulties; however, trail marking is irregular. Especially in the northern part, some sections are lengthy.

Accommodations and maps 
The section between Forno and Viozene may be hiked without camping; accommodations are available (posto tappa, with a red-and-white GTA flag), usually with half board. Some accommodations are simple (for example, a dormitory with bunk beds in an old school house); others are in private homes.

The GTA runs partially along the Sentiero Italia and Via Alpina (red-blue trail). Trail markers are red and white, some with "GTA" or "SI" in black. As part of an EU-funded initiative, Via Alpina boards were set up for each section. However, the trail is difficult to find in large towns and few local residents are familiar with the GTA.

Maps published by the Turin Istituto Centrale Geografico (IGC) are unreliable; entries for trails outside the GTA may be outdated (the trails are overgrown, or blocked by landslides). During the 1990s, a French-Italian joint project published several cross-border 1:50,000-scale maps (with EU support) from the French National Geographic Institute; however, they are out of print. Local maps are sometimes available in scales ranging from 1:40,000 to 1:25,000; their quality varies.
A two volume Italian guidebook has been published in 2011 (Southern part, Viozene to Susa) and 2016 (Northern part, Susa to Lago Maggiore).

Landscape and culture 
The GTA is a subalpine, montane trail primarily traversing a previously cultivated, densely populated landscape. Traditional mountain farming largely collapsed during the 20th century; areas in the GTA valleys suffered a population decline of 80 percent between 1870 and 2000, and the upper valley communities lost between 90 and 95 percent. Some abandoned hamlets had populations of about 100; others have one or two older residents left. Some descendants of original residents, heirs to property, return to the hamlets during summer as a second home; however, most houses have fallen into disrepair.

The GTA often runs along old roads which formerly connected hamlets;  mulattieras (mule paths) traversed chestnut forests which were destroyed by a 19th-century blight. At higher altitudes, old agricultural terraces and boundary walls may still be seen.

The Alpine valleys were culturally independent, and had contact with neighboring areas in France, Switzerland and the Po Valley. The Valsesia has long been settled by the Walser. In the Lanzo Valleys, as in the Aosta Valley, Arpitan was spoken; in the lower Susa Valley, the language was Piedmontese. South of the Susa Valley, the Occitan language predominated. Only during World War I did a significant part of the population begin speakingItalian. During the second half of the 20th century, there was the decline in regional languages; however, some Occitan speakers still remain in remote valleys. The Waldensian Evangelical Church has a following in the region.

History 
The GTA originated from a similar trail in France established about 1970, and is part of a network of European long-distance footpaths traversing the Alps. During the mid-1970s, a group of Turin mountain-hiking enthusiasts expanded the concept of a long-distance path following the Piedmontese Alpine arc around the Rivista della Montagna and libreria della Montagna. The volunteers later formed the Associazione GTA. The associated organized overnight accommodations and marked the trails, attracting public funds. From 1981 to 1989 a hiking guide was published in book form, and in 1982 a formal tour was organized  to publicize the trail.

The GTA experienced a boom in 1979, with up to 300 overnight hikers per section per season. After a few years interest by Italian hikers waned, and some posti tappa on the eastern route in the southern part closed. The GTA volunteer base shrank during the 1990s.

Since 1985, the GTA has been promoted in the German-speaking area of Werner Bätzing as an example of environmentally friendly tourism. The association's hiking guide has been updated regularly since 1989; however, the number of hikers has decreased.

Hikers walk the GTA predominantly from German-speaking regions. The average stay is a week, and there are many returning walkers. The exact number of overnight stays in individual sections is  unavailable, but are typically 100 to 200 per season. An estimated 1,000 long-distance hikers walk the GTA each season.

Sections (north to south)

Pennine (Valais) Alps: Valle Anzasca to Dora Baltea 
 From Molini di Calasca in Valle Anzasca to Alpe del Lago
 From the Colle dell'Usciolo to Campello Monti in Valstrona
 From the Bocchetta di Campello to Rimella
 Santa Maria di Fobello
 From the Colle d'Egua to Carcoforo
 From the Colle del Termo to Rima
Around Colle di Mud, Alpe Valmontasca and Alagna after St. Anthony di Val Vogna
Around Passo del Maccagno, Colle Lazoney and Colle Mologna Grande to Rifugio Rivetti
 San Giovanni d'Andorno
 From the Colle della Colma to Oropa
 To Coda refuge
 Around the Colle della Lace to Maletto
 To Quincinetto  train station (the GTA's lowest point)

Graian and Dora Baltea to the Susa Valley 
 Scalaro-Le Capanne
 Colle di Lavarossa to Succinto in the Val Chiusella
 Bocchetta delle Oche to Piamprato
 Ronco Canavese in the Val Soana
 Crest Colle to Talosio in the Valle Ribordone
 Monte Arzola and the Alpe di Colla to San Lorenzo di Piantonetto
Bertodasco, Perebella, Anna S., Coste and Fe to Noasca
 Ceresole Reale in the Valle dell'Orco
 Colle della Crocetta to Pialpetta in the Val Grande
 Colle di Trione to Balme in the Val d'Ala
 Passo Ghicet-Paschiet to Usseglio in the Valle di Viù
 Colle Croce di Ferro near Truc (il Trucco)
 Descent to Susa

Cottian Alps, Susa Valley and the Stura 
 Susa to Salbertrand
 Testa dell'Assietta to Usseaux in Chisone; alternate route Meana di Susa-Tues Alpeggio Toglie-Colle dell'Orsiera - Usseaux
 Colle dell'Albergian to Balsiglia (Posto Tappa may be closed)
Didiero and Serre Colle Vecchio to Rodoretto
Costa di Galmont to Ghigo di Prali (a short stage in the Valle Germanasca)
 Colle Giulian to Villanova in Val Pellice (partially destroyed by new road)
 Col del Rifugio Baracun Barbara Lowrie
 Colle della Gianna to Pian Melzè
Pian del Re for Rifugio Quintino Sella (Viso)
 Passo di San Chiaffredo and Castello to Pontechianale; western alternate Pian del Re-Col de la Traversette-Refuge du Viso-Passo di Vallanta-Refuge Vallanta-Passo Losetta-Chianale-Colle del Rastel-Pontechianale
 Colletto della Battagliola to Chiesa di Bellino
 Colle della Bicocca to Elva
Colle San Giovanni, Colle Bettone and San Martino to Palent
 Celle di Macra
 Monte Bastia and the Passo delle Crosette to Santuario di San Magno
 Colle Fauniera and Col Valcavera to Sambuco

Alps and Ligurian Alps from the Valle Stura Val Tanaro 
 From Sambuco Caserma del Vaccia and Besmorello to Bagni di Vinadio, at the end of the Chiesa di Bellino
 Passo di Bravaria to Sant'Anna di Vinadio
 Colle della Lombarda and Rifugio Rifugio la Grange Questa; alternate route Sant'Anna di Vinadio-Passo d'Orgials-Malinvern Refuge-Refuge Questa
Pian del Valasco to Terme di Valdieri
Refuge Morelli Buzzi and Colle del Chiapous to Rifugio Genova-Figari
 Colle delle Fenestrelle to Rifugio Soria Ellena
San Giacomo di Entracque and Caire della Truccia to Trinity of Entracque
 Colle della Garbella to Palanfrè
 Passo di Ciotto Mieu to Limonetto
 Colle di Tenda, Colla Piana and the Passo del Duca to Rifugio Garelli
Porta Sestrera (Passo di Lapasse) to Rifugio Giorgio De Havis
 Passo delle Saline and Rifugio Mongioie to Viozene

References

Further reading 
 Gillian Price: Through the Italian Alps: Grande Traversata Delle Alpi (GTA); Cicerone Press Limited, 2005, 9781852844172

External links 
 Wanderweb: Addenda to the hiking guides from Bätzing (in German)
 gtaweb: General tips and information about current stage (in German)

Alps
Hiking trails in Italy